Dinas Powys (also spelt "Dinas Powis" in English) is a small town and community in the Vale of Glamorgan, South Wales. Its name means "fort of the provincial place" and refers to the Iron Age hillfort which overlooks the village. It neighbours the larger town of Penarth.

Although several housing developments have been added since the late 20th century, the old centre of Dinas Powys maintains a traditional, almost rural character. It has a village common and small independent shops, public houses, restaurants and community facilities. Garages, small supermarkets, a pharmacy and a veterinary practice can be found in other parts of the town.

According to recent electoral rolls, the population is in the region of 8,800, making Dinas Powys the fifth largest settlement in the Vale of Glamorgan.

History

The Neolithic and the Middle Ages

The Dinas Powys area has been populated since prehistoric times. The most ancient artifact found in the area is a Neolithic Stone Age axe-head, discovered by P. W. Brooks in 1949 and now displayed in the National Museum Cardiff. The hillfort was, in its time, considered to have great status and wealth. Indeed, in the age of Celtic Christianity, residents of Dinas Powys had use of day-to-day objects from Bordeaux, Athens and Alexandria.

The village features substantial remains of a Norman castle and the adjacent Cwm George was the site of the Celtic hill fort from which the village takes its name. The hill fort site was excavated by Leslie Alcock of University College, Cardiff between 1954 and 1958 and was found to contain evidence of major wooden structures and a large quantity of high-status metalwork and jewellery. There were also glass items and imported pottery dating from the sub-Roman period of between the 5th and 7th centuries.

In the 11th century, Dinas Powys was under the control of Sir Reginald de Sully, one of the Twelve Knights of Glamorgan. In 1591, Sir Edward Mansel of Margam wrote his historical document recording The Winning of Glamorgan and said:
 To Sir Reginald de Sully he (Sir Robert Fitz Haymon) gave the castle and town to be called Sully with the Manor of it, and the Manors of St Andrews and Dinas Powys for his Granary and provisions. This Sir Reginald bestowed much land in fee frankliege to his men and came to be a man of wealth and fame. He had at Sully besides his Castle a fair Manor house built after a new manner, where he did live the most of his time, which house as well as the Castle was broke down by Owain Glendowr
Mansel also records:
 The Lordship of Llantwit is described as so fertile that as Glamorgan was called the Garden of Wales was this Lordship called the Garden of Glamorgan ... and it is the flower of all the Country ... and it was very full of goodly villages and Courtly houses, most of them still in remaining. The Lord had in this Lordship a noble Castle at Dinas Powys and one at Barry, with his Court house of Llantwit and Grange house of Boverton, so that in the whole it is a most Goodly Country.

Dinas Powys was included in the original medieval Welsh political sub-division called the Cantref Brenhinol (the Royal Hundred) which later became the commote known as the Hundred of Dinas Powis, which also encompassed St Andrews Major, Michaelston-le-Pit, Westra, Penarth, Cogan, Sully, Lavernock and Llandough.

Rapid expansion in 19th century
By 1833, Dinas Powys barely existed. The nearby St. Andrews Major was at the time substantially larger, but added together their population was still only 474 in total. 
 
The village population remained almost static at about 300-400 people until the second half of the 19th century, when there was an influx into the community, including a large contingent from the West Country. The growth of the coal industry saw the first passenger train arrive in Dinas Powys on 20 December 1898, and thereafter the population increased rapidly. The new rail link was laid at the bottom end of the Dinas Powys valley and provided a rapid connection to new docks built in Cardiff, Barry and Penarth to handle the expanding coal trade from the South Wales valleys. At that time the only features below St Andrews Major were the small hamlet of Dinas Powys, the rail line, Cadoxton Brook and a number of small farms.

The new rail link provided far better communication and transport to the area, making it a more attractive residential prospect, and many workers from Barry and Cardiff moved in. By 1891, the village population had more than doubled to 1,149; ten years later, it was over 2,000. Dinas Powys expanded in two ways: from the railway link towards St. Andrew's Major many imposing and fine houses were built, in contrast to the 'railway suburbs' that grew up along the railway, near the current area of Eastbrook, where the new housing was of more modest proportions.

A few years after the railway was constructed, the main Cardiff Road was developed over the previous unmetalled trackway that followed the route of the railway line. This provided a further burst of population growth and house building.

20th century
A corner of the village common land was sold to the Barry Docks and Railway Company for £160. The then Lord of the Manor and ex-military survivor of the First World War, Major General Henry Lee, donated an additional sum of £30 and in 1935 the combined fund was used to upgrade the small green in the centre of the village, known locally as the Twyn, with a war memorial.

Geography

Dinas Powys is spread across the full width of a wooded valley, with the Cadoxton River running in the valley.

The surrounding soils are mostly a strong, brown, dry earth, useful for arable farming; the growing of various grains contributed to the area being a mostly farming community until the modern era. The substratum under the whole area is a limestone that was likely laid down under a warm ocean in the distant past. 

The village has not been able to spread northwards, because of golf courses and protected woodlands between Dinas Powys and Michaelston-le-pit. The freeholders of Cwrt-yr-Ala Estate prevented the two from merging. More recent housing development has taken place in a linear fashion either side of the main Cardiff road and in the direction of Cadoxton and Barry. Cwm George and Cwrt-yr-Ala are woodlands in the area.

Maps over the last hundred years show that Penarth and Dinas Powys have spread and grown closer together. In many places the two communities are only separated by a few hundred yards and a couple of fields; however, no direct road connections have been added, entailing a car journey of several miles via Llandough. The only existing direct road is the medieval, winding single-track Cross Common Road. Another traditional lane crossing, which existed between the current site of the Tesco Express mini-supermarket and the Erw Delyn school at Redlands Heights, Penarth, was closed to through traffic following extensions to the Murch estate in the 1970s.

According to the Environment Agency, in the floods of October 1998 six properties at Dinas Powys were affected. Flooding was caused by the floodwater overtopping the banks of the Cadoxton River among others, restrictions to flow in channels and surcharging of drains.

Governance
The community of Dinas Powys (which includes St Andrews Major and Westra) elects a community council. Uniquely for this part of Wales, the council was dominated by the Welsh nationalist party Plaid Cymru for over two decades. More recently, this dominance has reduced slightly. In May 2008, the Conservative Party won four additional seats on the community council, all at the expense of Plaid Cymru, including the defeat of Chris Franks.

An electoral ward of the same name exists, for elections to Vale of Glamorgan Council. This ward mainly covers Dinas Powys but also stretches north to Michaelston. The total population of the ward at the 2011 census was 7,799. Until May 2017, the ward was represented by three Plaid Cymru councillors and an independent. In the 2017 elections, all four seats were won by the Conservatives (Vince Driscoll, Andy Robertson, Rob Crowley and Steve Griffiths). The Conservatives also gained seats at Plaid Cymru's expense on the community council.

Dinas Powys falls within the Vale of Glamorgan parliamentary constituency and is currently represented in the UK Parliament by the Conservative MP Alun Cairns.

The Senedd constituency of Vale of Glamorgan is represented by Jane Hutt of Welsh Labour.

Demography
The 2001 UK Census recorded the population of Dinas Powys as 8,512. In the 2011 Census, the number had fallen to 7,490. However, electoral roll information in 2012 indicated that the population was 8,790.

There are few major employers in the village. The majority of the working population commute to Cardiff, Penarth and Barry.

Landmarks
Local landmarks include Dinas Powys Castle, the village common, and the war memorial on the village green.

Several pubs serve the village, mostly in the village centre; they include the Star, the Cross Keys and the Three Horse Shoes. Other former pubs were the Swan in Eastbrook (which closed permanently in 2007) and the Castle Oak (until 2006 known as the Malthouse), located on the Murch estate, which closed during 2011. The latter site is now operated by Tesco.

The Mount, a late Georgian villa, is a Grade 2 listed building. It was originally a farmhouse called Mount Pleasant and was occupied by the Hurst family, who held the manor of Dinas Powys. The house was extended in the 19th century by the Lee family, who built a new south wing and renamed it the Mount. It was further modified in the Victorian period before being converted into separate dwellings in the 20th century.

Religious sites

St. Peter's Church on Mill Road is the village's main Church in Wales parish church, while the Catholic congregation worships at St. Mary's on Edith Road. St Peter's was built in 1929–1930 to replace the old "Iron Church" in the village square, which had served as a chapel of ease for St. Andrews since 1881, but could only hold 180 worshippers. The new church's foundation stone was laid on St. Peter's Day on 29 June 1929; it was consecrated on 15 October 1930. The church was designed by the Glamorgan architect J Coates Carter, and was built after his death. Much of the masonry was reused from the recently demolished Cyfarthfa Ironworks. St Peter's is currently a Grade 2 listed building.

Dinas Powys is also noted for its 14th century Norman parish church, dedicated to St Andrew. This is located in the hamlet of St Andrews Major, just under a mile away from the village centre. There is also the nearby church of St Michael and All Angels in Michaelston-le-Pit.

There are also two Methodist chapels in the village. One is a small "tin Tabernacle" in the Eastbrook area; the larger Methodist Church backs onto Station Road. Dinas Powys Baptist Church meets in the Parish Hall on Britway Road, and Bethesda Chapel is on Fairoaks. Ebenezer Presbyterian Church is located in the Highwalls Road area.

Education

Dinas Powys has two primary schools, Dinas Powys Primary School (formed in 2015 by the amalgamation of Dinas Powys Infants' School and Murch Junior School) and St Andrews Major Church in Wales Primary School. 

The village has no secondary school of its own. It was previously home to one half of Penarth’s St Cyres Comprehensive School. The site was the smaller of the school's two campuses and was for pupils aged 11 to 14; the site for the older children was in Penarth. However, the Dinas Powys site closed in 2012, and was replaced by a single, larger redeveloped site in Penarth.

Sports and recreation

The recreation area at the village common, administered by Dinas Powys Community Council, is home to several sports teams. Rugby was played on the common in 1882, when a group of young farm workers challenged players at the new Gwalia Brickworks. Dinas Powys Rugby Club is located on the common and plays in the WRU League 1 East Central. The club has won the East District cup on two occasions, and the 2nd XV (known as the Dingos) won the Mallett cup in 2016. Organised sports are also played on Parc Bryn-a-don and the Murch Playing Fields.

Dinas Powys Football Club became the first in the Vale of Glamorgan to achieve the Football Association of Wales' Club Accreditation Scheme Bronze Award. 

Dinas Powys Golf Club was founded in 1914 and has views over the city of Cardiff and Cardiff Bay.

Dinas Powys Cricket Club was established in 1882. The club fields three sides in the Welsh Club Cricket Conference, playing their home league matches at Parc Bryn y Don. There is also a Midweek League side and a Sunday friendly side, playing home matches on the village common. The club also has a junior section.

There has been an active branch of the Pony Club in the village since 1975. There are also many voluntary organisations, including a large Scout group.

Filming 
The 2021 ITV television drama series Hollington Drive was filmed in Dinas Powys, in the luxury housing estate on Ardwyn Walk.

Transport

The village has two railway stations, one at either end of the village: Eastbrook station is at the Cardiff end and Dinas Powys station at the Barry end. Both stations are on Network Rail's Barry branch line, with passenger trains operated by Transport for Wales.

Notable people

The following people live, or have previously lived, in Dinas Powys:
John Smith – former Labour Member of Parliament
Ray Smith (1936–1991) – actor
Huw Justin Smith (1965–2007) – son of Ray Smith and better known as Pepsi Tate, bass guitarist of the Welsh glam metal band Tigertailz
Dave Edmunds (born 1944) – recording artist and record producer
Sarah Loosemore (born 1971) – tennis player
Donna Edwards – actress
Noel Johnson – radio actor
Jeremy Colman – former Auditor General for Wales
Charlotte Church – singer and TV personality
Hannah Mills – Olympic medalist sailor

References

External links

Dinas Powys website
Dinas Powys FC website

 
Villages in the Vale of Glamorgan
Communities in the Vale of Glamorgan